Chiretolpis woodlarkiana is a moth of the family Erebidae.

It is endemic to the Woodlark Islands of the Solomon Sea in Papua New Guinea.

References

Nudariina
Endemic fauna of Papua New Guinea
Moths of Papua New Guinea
Woodlark Islands
Moths described in 1901